Bairisetty, Bairisetti or Byrisetty  (Telugu: బైరిశెట్టి) is one of the Indian surnames this surname is used by Kapu, Balija and Naidu Caste. this surname is mostly used in Andhra Pradesh state  Coastal Andhra and Rayalaseema regions. Bairisetty derived from the name of Bairi word means Peregrine falcon in Telugu గద్ద or గ్రద్ద

References

Indian surnames
Telugu-language surnames